Franklin County is a county located in the U.S. state of Mississippi. As of the 2020 census, the population was 7,675. Its county seat is Meadville. The county was formed on December 21, 1809, from portions of Adams County and named for Founding Father Benjamin Franklin. It is bisected by the Homochitto River, which runs diagonally through the county from northeast to southwest.

History
This was the fourth county organized in Mississippi. It was initially developed for agriculture, specifically cotton plantations based on enslaved labor of African Americans. Cotton continued to be important to the economy through the 19th century and into the early 20th century.

This still rural county has had a decline in population by about half since 1910. It is the fourth least populous county in the state. Mechanization of agriculture and the blight of the boll weevil both reduced the need for farm workers; they left the area and often the state. Many African Americans went north or west in the Great Migration before and after World War II. The county in the 21st century is majority white in population; in the 2000 census, African Americans composed more than 36% of the population. (See Demographics section below.)

As in the rest of the state, the county had racially segregated facilities under Jim Crow from the late 19th century. Many white residents opposed the civil rights movement of the mid-20th century. In May 1964, Ku Klux Klan members abducted and killed two young black men, Henry Hezekiah Dee and Charles Eddie Moore of Meadville, before Freedom Summer started. Their bodies were not discovered in the Mississippi River until July 1964, during the hunt for three disappeared civil rights workers.

No one was prosecuted at the time, but the case was reopened in 2007, after a documentary had been released on it by Canadian Broadcasting Company. Local man James Ford Seale was convicted of the kidnappings and deaths by an all-white jury in federal court. In 2008 the families of Dee and Moore filed a civil suit against the Franklin County government, charging complicity by its law enforcement in the deaths. On June 21, 2010, Franklin County agreed to an undisclosed settlement in the civil suit with the families of Charles Moore and Henry Dee.

Geography

Major highways
  U.S. Highway 84
  U.S. Highway 98
  Mississippi Highway 33

Adjacent counties
 Jefferson County (north)
 Lincoln County (east)
 Amite County (south)
 Wilkinson County (southwest)
 Adams County (west)

National protected area
 Homochitto National Forest (part)

Communities

Towns
 Bude
 Meadville
 Roxie

Unincorporated communities
 Eddiceton
 Hamburg
 Knoxville
 Little Springs
 Lucien
 McCall Creek
 Quentin
 Veto

Demographics

As of the 2020 United States census, there were 7,675 people, 2,928 households, and 2,096 families residing in the county.

Politics

In the 1964 Presidential election Barry Goldwater reportedly received 96.05% of the county's vote. Although the white-majority county has supported Southern Democrats such as Jimmy Carter for the presidency, since 2000 the Republican candidate has consistently received over 60% of the vote.

See also
 Dry counties
 National Register of Historic Places listings in Franklin County, Mississippi

References

External links
 Franklin County Courthouse Pictures

 
Mississippi counties
1809 establishments in Mississippi Territory
Populated places established in 1809